Cyrtodactylus bapme, the Garo Hills bent-toed gecko, is a species of gecko endemic to India.

References

Cyrtodactylus
Reptiles described in 2021